Worlds of Fantasy was an American science fiction magazine published from 1968 to 1971 for a total of four issues.  Lester del Rey edited the first two issues; the last two were edited by Ejler Jakobsson.  It was intended as a fantasy companion to Galaxy Science Fiction and published some well-received material, including Ursula Le Guin's Tombs of Atuan and Clifford D. Simak's Destiny Doll.

References

Defunct science fiction magazines published in the United States
Magazines established in 1968
Magazines disestablished in 1971
Science fiction magazines established in the 1960s